Giuseppe di Giacomo (3 November, 1632 – 21 March, 1684) was a Roman Catholic prelate who served as Bishop of Bovino (1673–1684).

Biography
Giuseppe di Giacomo was born in Messina, Italy on 3 November 1632 and ordained a priest on 30 September 1657. On 27 February 1673, he was appointed during the papacy of Pope Clement X as Bishop of Bovino. On 12 March 1673, he was consecrated bishop by Gasparo Carpegna, Cardinal-Priest of San Silvestro in Capite, with Alessandro Crescenzi (cardinal), Titular Patriarch of Alexandria, and Hyacinthe Libelli, Archbishop of Avignon, serving as co-consecrators. He served as Bishop of Bovino until his death on 21 March 1684.

Episcopal succession 
While bishop, he was the principal co-consecrator of:
Carlo Pellegrini (bishop), Bishop of Avellino e Frigento (1673);
Domenico Sorrentino, Bishop of Ruvo (1673);
Stefan Knezevic (Conti), Archbishop of Sardica (1677); and
Gaspar Gasparini, Titular Bishop of Spiga (1677).

See also
Catholic Church in Italy

References 

17th-century Italian Roman Catholic bishops
Bishops appointed by Pope Clement X
1632 births
1684 deaths